Quipuanthus is a genus of flowering plants belonging to the family Melastomataceae.

Its native range is Ecuador to Northern Peru.

Species:
 Quipuanthus epipetricus Michelang. & C.Ulloa

References

Melastomataceae
Melastomataceae genera